The Yuwengdao Lighthouse or Yuwongdao Lighthouse, Fisher Island Lighthouse, Yuweng Tao Lighthouse, Yu-Won Island Lighthouse, West Island Lighthouse and Xiyu Lighthouse  is a lighthouse in Wai'an Village, Xiyu Township, Penghu County, Taiwan. The Yuwengdao Lighthouse is the oldest lighthouse in Taiwan.

History
The Yuwengdao Lighthouse was built by British engineer, David Marr Henderson, in 1875 on the site of the earlier "Xiyu Pagoda Lighthouse" (Chinese: 西嶼塔燈; pinyin: Xīyǔ tǎdēng), which was originally built in 1778 during the Qianlong Emperor reign of Taiwan. The earlier Xiyu Pagoda Lighthouse structure was a stone tower with an oil lamp light source, and is mentioned on a stone stele that still stands within the grounds of the Yuwengdao Lighthouse. Originally having black exterior, the Yuwengdao Lighthouse was repainted white in 1915. The site was opened to the public in 1992.

Architecture
The lighthouse is built of cast iron painted white and stands at a height of 11 meters.

Documentary
The Yuwengdao Lighthouse was the focus of the short documentary film, The Coastwise Lights of Penghu : The Fisher Island (Yuwengdao) Lighthouse
燈塔記憶 : 澎湖漁翁島燈塔, published in 2017 by the City University of Hong Kong (CityU).

See also

 List of tourist attractions in Taiwan
 List of lighthouses in Taiwan

References

External links

 Maritime and Port Bureau MOTC

1778 establishments in Taiwan
Lighthouses completed in 1875
Lighthouses in Penghu County
National monuments of Taiwan